Beach Mix is Koda Kumi's sixth remix album, out August 1, 2012. It is her first album to feature a playbutton - the album contained on an mp3 player in a button. It comes in three editions: CD, CD+DVD and CD+DVD+Playbutton. Beach Mix became her highest charting remix album, coming in at #4 on Oricon and staying on the charts for seven weeks.

It features a new song and music video: "Whatchu Waitin' On?". It is also her first album released since giving birth to her and Kenji03's son, with the music video being filmed while she was pregnant (in the video, only Kumi's upper body is shown).

Track listing 
Official track list.

CD
"Whatchu Waitin' On?"
Lyrics: Koda Kumi • Matthew Tishler
Music: Daniel J.Plante • Matthew Tishler
"KO-SO-KO-SO" (Prog5 Remix)
"Bling Bling Bling feat. AK-69" (Electro Rave Allstars Remix)
"Hey baby!" (FUTURE HOUSE UNITED Remix)
"V.I.P. feat. T-PAIN" (Sunset In Ibiza Remix)
"Pop Diva" (KOZMR Remix Lucas Valentine)
"Be My Baby" (4 Skips Remix)
"No Tricks" (Shohei Matsumoto & Junichi Matsuda Remix)
"Heat feat. MEGARYU" (REO Remix)
"Cutie Honey" (HABANERO POSSE REMIX)
"D.D.D. feat. SOULHEAD" (Pink Chameleons Remix)
"Come With Me" (Overhead Champion Remix)
"Twinkle" (R-midwest Remix)
"Lick me♥" (Floorbreaker Remix)
"Cherry Girl" (Sunset In Ibiza Remix)
"Taboo" (KOZMR Remix スグル・ヤマモト)

DVD
 "Whatchu Waitin' On?" (Music Video)
 "Whatchu Waitin' On?" (Making Video)
 "a-nation & Rhythm Nation BEST SELECTION"
 "Come With Me" (a-nation'03)
 "Cutie Honey" (a-nation'05)
 "real Emotion" (a-nation'05)
 "D.D.D." (Rhythm Nation'06)
 "Unmei" (Rhythm Nation'06)
 "Ningyo-hime" (Rhythm Nation'06)
 "Cherry Girl" (Rhythm Nation'06)
 "girls" (a-nation'07)
 "Lady Go!" (a-nation'08)
 "Moon Crying" (a-nation'08)
 "Freaky" (a-nation'08)
 "Lick me♥" (a-nation'09)
 "Ecstasy" (a-nation'09)
 "Lollipop" (a-nation'10)
 "Universe" (a-nation'10)
 "Be My Baby" (a-nation'11)
 "Bling Bling Bling" (a-nation'11)

Oricon Sales Chart (Japan)

References

External links
Koda Kumi Official

Koda Kumi albums
Avex Group remix albums
2012 remix albums